Ferdinand of Aragon may refer to:
 Ferdinand of Aragon – Lord of Albarracín, illegitimate son of Peter III of Aragon with Inés Zapata.
 Ferdinand I of Aragon, also known as Ferdinand of Antequera (r. 1412–1416) 
 Ferdinand II of Aragon, who married Isabella of Castile to become king of Spain, (1452–1516)
 Ferdinand of Aragón, Duke of Calabria (1488–1550)